This is a list of Members of Parliament (MPs) who lost their seat in the 2022 French legislative election. All of these deputies sat in the 15th legislature of the French Fifth Republic but were not returned to the French Parliament in the election.

List

Open seats changing hands 
 Ain's 2nd constituency (MoDem gain from LR)
 Aisne's 5th constituency (RN gain from LREM)
 Aveyron's 2nd constituency (LFI gain from LREM)
 Essonne's 2nd constituency (RN gain from LR)
 Paris's 14th constituency 
 Seine-et-Marne's 2nd constituency
 Val-de-Marne's 5th constituency
 Val-de-Marne's 7th constituency
 Var's 3rd constituency
 Ninth constituency for French residents overseas

See also 
 Candidates in the 2022 French legislative election
 Election results of Cabinet Ministers during the 2022 French legislative election
 List of MPs who lost their seat in the 2017 French legislative election
 Results of the 2022 French legislative election by constituency

Notes

References 

2022 French legislative election
Lists of French MPs who were defeated by election